Sevier County High School is a public high school in Sevierville, Tennessee. It is part of the Sevier County Schools district.

Demographics
The ethnic makeup of the school is approximately 76.8% Non-Hispanic White, 19.0% Hispanic or Latino, 1.8% Asian, 1.5% Black or African American, 0.3% Native American, 0.2% Pacific Islander, and 0.5% from two or more races. Approximately 53.0% of the students are male and 47.0% are female.

Athletics
The school's mascot is the Smoky Bear, and its colors are purple and white. The school competes in the Tennessee Secondary School Athletic Association (TSSAA), and offers the following sports:

Baseball
Boys' Basketball - state appearance, 2019
Girls' Basketball - state championship, 2002
Boys' Bowling
Girls' Bowling
Boys' Cross Country 
Girls' Cross Country
Boys' Golf - state championship, 2015
Girls' Golf
Boys' Track and Field - state championships, 2010, 2016
Girls' Track and Field - state championships, 1983, 1984
Cheerleading
Football - state championship, 1999.
Softball - 
Volleyball
Boys' Soccer - state championship, 2021

Alumni 
 Dolly Parton (class of 1964) - singer-songwriter, actress, philanthropist, and businesswoman.

References

Public high schools in Tennessee
Schools in Sevier County, Tennessee
Sevierville, Tennessee